Centre for the Rehabilitation of the Paralysed or CRP is a Bangladesh non government organisation that works for the rehabilitation of the paralysed in Bangladesh and is located in Savar, Bangladesh.

History
The Centre for the Rehabilitation of the Paralysed was established on 11 December 1979 by Valerie Ann Taylor. Taylor was a British national who had come to Bangladesh on an aid mission. It was originally located in disused warehouses of Shaheed Suhrawardy Medical College & Hospital  but was moved to Savar in 1990. The centre has a hundred-bed hospital.

References

Disability organisations based in Bangladesh
1979 establishments in Bangladesh
Organisations based in Savar